The Journal of Simulation is a peer-reviewed scientific journal covering research and practice in the field of simulation. It is an official journal of The Operational Research Society.  According to the Journal Citation Reports, the journal has a 2019 impact factor of 1.214.

Contents
The journal publishes both full length articles and technical notes. These include techniques, tools, methods, and technologies relevant to the application and the use of discrete-event simulation. Domains include manufacturing, service, defence, health care, and general commerce.

Abstracting and indexing
The Journal of Simulation is abstracted and indexed by ABI/Inform, Compendex, International Abstracts in Operations Research, and Scopus.

References

External links 
 

Publications established in 2006
English-language journals
Business and management journals
Quarterly journals
Palgrave Macmillan academic journals
Operational Research Society academic journals